Cardinal-Infante Ferdinand (also known as Don Fernando de Austria, Cardenal-Infante Fernando de España and as Ferdinand von Österreich; May 1609 or 1610 – 9 November 1641) was Governor of the Spanish Netherlands, Cardinal of the Holy Catholic Church, Infante of Spain, Infante of Portugal (until 1640), Archduke of Austria, Archbishop of Toledo (1619–41), and military commander during the Thirty Years' War.

Biography

Youth 
Born at the El Escorial near Madrid, Spain in 16091, he was the son of the King of Spain and Portugal, Philip III and II and Margaret of Austria, sister of Emperor Ferdinand II. His older siblings were King Philip IV and III and the French queen Anne of Austria.

As his father wished that he pursue an ecclesiastical career, Ferdinand was elevated to the Primacy of Spain in 1619, becoming Archbishop of Toledo. Shortly afterwards he was created Cardinal. The style Cardinal-Infante was a combination of his dignity as Cardinal and his station as a royal Prince (Infante in Spanish) of Spain. Ferdinand was never actually ordained a priest (though he received the minor orders).

Events leading to the Battle of Nördlingen 
In 1630 the Cardinal Infante's aunt Isabella Clara Eugenia planned to make him her successor as governor of the Spanish Netherlands. To move to the Netherlands in a style befitting a governor, a strong army had to accompany him. Travel by ship from Spain was not an option as it would expose him to risk of battle with the Dutch navy in the then ongoing Eighty Years' War, so in 1633, he went to Genoa, having quit his governorship of Catalonia where he had been trained.  He met with an army from Milan for a planned march through the famous Spanish Way across Lombardy, Tyrol, and Swabia, and then following the Rhine to the Netherlands. Ferdinand also planned to secure this supply route with a string of garrisons, and to support the army of King Ferdinand III of Hungary, his brother-in-law the emperor's son and heir, who was leading the Imperial army facing the Swedes in the Thirty Years' War.

Since disease delayed his travels, he sent half of his army ahead under the command of the Duke of Feria. However, this army was severely depleted during fighting with the Swedish army of Bernhard of Saxe-Weimar and Gustaf Horn. The Spanish requested 4000 cavalry from the Imperial general Albrecht von Wallenstein, but this being denied, the Spanish had to fund the troops on their own. The Cardinal-Infante was able to continue his travels in 1634, collecting in Bavaria the remains of the army of Feria, who had died in January 1634.

Battle of Nördlingen 

Meanwhile, Ferdinand of Hungary was able to defeat the Swedish army at Regensburg in July 1634. Ferdinand and his cousin the Cardinal-Infante Ferdinand then raced to merge their armies. The Swedish forces of Bernhard of Saxe-Weimar and Gustaf Horn desperately tried to prevent this merger, but were unable to catch up with Ferdinand of Hungary. The Cardinal-Infante crossed the Danube in August 1634. In September both armies were able to merge, and camped south of Nördlingen in Swabia. At that time Nördlingen was protected by a small Swedish garrison. Shortly thereafter, the armies of Bernhard of Saxe-Weimar and Gustaf Horn also reached Nördlingen, preparing the events for the decisive Battle of Nördlingen. Cardinal-Infante Ferdinand and his cousin Ferdinand then prepared for battle, ignoring the advice of the more experienced generals, such as the Imperial general Matthias Gallas. Bernhard and Horn also prepared for battle, but they were by now rivals and in disagreement with each other. They also underestimated the numerically superior enemy forces, due to incorrect reports that did not realize the Spanish Army of the late Duke of Feria had joined the Cardinal-Infante and believed that the enemy forces numbered only 7,000, not 21,000 infantry, compared to 16,000 Swedish infantry. During the battle, almost anything that could go wrong went wrong for the Swedish forces, in large part due to the efforts of the Spanish Infantry, so that the two Ferdinands achieved a great victory. The Swedish army that fled to Heilbronn was only a shadow of its former self.

The Spanish Netherlands 

The King of Hungary tried to convince his cousin to stay and to strengthen their hold on Germany, but the Cardinal-Infante Ferdinand moved his troops almost immediately after the battle to continue to Brussels. At the end of 1634 he entered Brussels with all the glory befitting a Governor-General. Due to the unpopularity of the clergy in Brussels, he downplayed his religious status and instead emphasized his worldly ranks. Ferdinand was a skilled politician and diplomat, and quickly reformed the government and the military. He especially managed to win the support of the Flemings against France. However, his powers were secretly limited, and the leader of his army was instructed to follow Spanish orders instead of Ferdinand's orders if necessary.

In 1635, the French attacked Namur, planning to merge with the Dutch near Maastricht but were held off by well prepared defenses. At the siege of Leuven, the invading Franco-Dutch forces, suffering badly from supply problems and greatly depleted by disease and desertion, were forced to withdraw when a Spanish relief force arrived. This allowed Spanish forces under Ferdinand to go on the offensive. The Dutch were driven back and the French retreated. Ferdinand subsequently was able to capture Diest, Goch, Gennep, Limbourg, and Schenkenschanz.

In 1636, Ferdinand disempowered the last Protestant priests in the Spanish Netherlands, and continued his military counter-offensive by capturing Hirson, Le Catelet, and La Capelle, and securing Luxembourg using the usual mixed nationalities typical of the early modern age that included Croatian troops, and reaching as far a stronghold in France as Corbie, threatening Paris.

In 1637, with Spanish forces concentrated in the fight with the French, a relatively lightly defended Breda, that had been under Spanish control for twelve years, was recaptured by the Dutch after a 3-month siege by the Prince of Orange. The loss of Breda was a major blow to Spanish prestige, but was offset by the gains made by Ferdinand that year in taking the Dutch towns of Venlo and Roermond in the Meuse, effectively cutting Maastricht from the Dutch Republic and, thus, preventing further Dutch attacks on the Spanish Netherlands from the east. In the southern front Ferdinand lost the towns of La Capelle, Landrecies, and Damvillers to the French, but then he forced them to retreat south of Maubeuge.

In 1638, Ferdinand's army successfully defended Antwerp, Saint-Omer and Geldern from the Dutch and French armies. Ferdinand achieved a great victory over the Dutch at the Battle of Kallo. In a letter to his brother the King of Spain shortly afterwards, Ferdinand described the battle as "the greatest victory which your Majesty's arms have achieved since the war in the Low Countries began". 

In 1639, Ferdinand managed again to thwart Franco-Dutch plans. The Dutch navy destroyed an important Spanish fleet in the Battle of the Downs, off the English coast, but it failed to prevent most of the army it was carrying, some 7,000 to 10,500 infantry, from landing at Dunkirk. While Ferdinand frustrated the Prince of Orange's move against Hulst, an Imperial-Spanish army under Count Piccolomini destroyed the main French army in the south at the Battle of Thionville.

In 1640, Dutch attacks on Hulst and Bruges were repelled by the local Spanish garrisons. In the south, after a failed attack on the Spanish fortress of Charlemont in Givet, the French army launched a great offensive upon Arras, the capital of the County of Artois. Ferdinand took the command of the army and attempted unsuccessfully to break the French lines. The city finally surrendered on 9 August. Its capture was the first victory of importance for the French in the war after five years of fighting.

Fall from grace 
More dangerous than his military enemies were, however, his enemies at the Spanish court. Numerous rumours and lies floated about, and it was claimed that Ferdinand was planning to become an independent ruler of the Spanish Netherlands with the help of the French King, an enemy of Spain. This rumour was enhanced by another rumour that the French court was planning to marry Ferdinand to Anne Marie Louise d'Orléans, Duchess of Montpensier, the (eldest) daughter of Gaston, Duke of Orléans, the French king's brother. The former claim was untrue however his sister Anne of Austria did suggest a marriage between Ferdinand and Anne Marie Louise, the greatest heiress in Europe. Making matters worse, the Spanish empire was under intense pressure militarily and financially; the Cardinal-Infante was even given conflicting orders to send troops to Spain to aid against the 1640 Portuguese uprising.

Death
Ferdinand fell ill during battles in 1641, and died on 9 November 1641 in Brussels at age 32. It was thought that death was caused by exhaustion combined with ill health. Reports talk about a stomach ulcer, but rumors also claimed that he was poisoned. Before his death he had an illegitimate daughter, Marie Anne de la Croix, born in Brussels in 1641 and died a nun in Madrid in 1715.

His body was brought to Spain in 1643, and 12,000 requiem Masses were performed in accordance with his last wishes. He was buried in the Panteón de Infantes.

Disputes about his successor as the Governor-General of the Spanish Netherlands destroyed the alliance between the Emperor in Vienna and the Spanish in Madrid. The Emperor (by now the Cardinal-Infante's old comrade in arms, Ferdinand III) favored his brother Archduke Leopold Wilhelm of Austria, a militarily unfortunate but otherwise a capable ruler. Madrid favored John of Austria the Younger, the twelve-year-old illegitimate son of Philip IV and the actress María Calderón. The inauguration of the unpopular bastard was delayed, and the rule of the Spanish Netherlands was taken over by Francisco de Mello, Marquis of Terceira.

Ancestry

Notes

External links 

 
 WER war WER - im Dreißigjährigen Krieg
 Enrique Garcia-Herraiz:Un nuevo retrato del Cardenal Infante don Fernando, conmemorando la victoria de Nördlingen

1610 births
1641 deaths
People from San Lorenzo de El Escorial
Spanish infantes
Portuguese infantes
17th-century House of Habsburg
Governors of the Habsburg Netherlands
Spanish generals
17th-century Spanish cardinals
Viceroys of Catalonia
Archbishops of Toledo
17th-century Roman Catholic archbishops in Spain
Burials in the Pantheon of Infantes at El Escorial
Military personnel of the Franco-Spanish War (1635–1659)
Military personnel of the Thirty Years' War
Sons of kings